Motahar Uddin (24 August 1935 - 10 January 1974) is a Bangladesh Awami League politician and the former Member of Parliament of Barisal-3.

Career
Uddin was elected to parliament from Barisal-3 as a Bangladesh Awami League candidate in 1973. He founded Surjamoni New Model Secondary School.

References

Awami League politicians
1935 births
1st Jatiya Sangsad members
1974 deaths